Policy Exchange is a British conservative think tank based in London. In 2007 it was described in The Daily Telegraph as "the largest, but also the most influential think tank on the right". The Washington Post said Policy Exchange's reports "often inform government policy in Britain." and Iain Dale described it as the "pre-eminent think tank in the Westminster village", in ConservativeHome. Policy Exchange is a registered charity.

Founded in 2002, it describes itself as an independent, non-partisan educational charity whose mission is to develop and promote new policy ideas that will deliver better public services, a stronger society and a more dynamic economy. 

The policy ideas developed by the think tank which have been adopted as government policy include free schools, Police and Crime Commissioners, Garden Villages and protecting the armed forces from lawfare. Policy Exchange has a unit called Judicial Power Project that examines the power of the British judiciary and argues that unelected judges have accrued too much power.

It describes itself as seeking localist, volunteer and free-market solutions to public policy problems, with research programmes covering education and social reform, energy and environment, Britain's place in the world, economics and industrial policy, housing policy, space, counter-terrorism and demography, integration and immigration.

History
Policy Exchange was set up in 2002 by a group including Nicholas Boles (director), Michael Gove (chairman) and Francis Maude. Maude went on to become Minister for the Cabinet Office, and names being one of the co-founders as his proudest political achievement. Gove went on to become Secretary of State for Education, Secretary of State for Justice, Secretary of State for the Environment, Food and Rural Affairs, and Chancellor of the Duchy of Lancaster. He is currently Secretary of State for Levelling Up, Housing and Communities.

In May 2007, Boles was succeeded as director by Anthony Browne, a journalist and political correspondent for The Times. In September 2008, Browne stepped down to work for Boris Johnson, and was succeeded by Neil O'Brien, formerly director of Open Europe. In November 2012, O'Brien was appointed as a special adviser to George Osborne, and in 2013 he was succeeded by Dean Godson, formerly head of Policy Exchange's security unit.

In November 2018, Mark Carney, Governor of the Bank of England, described Policy Exchange as "multidisciplinary, highly influential, a productive force at the heart of Westminster and our political system." In 2020, Iain Dale described Policy Exchange as "the pre-eminent think tank in the Westminster village". Although sometime associated with the British centre-right, it also attracts contributors from the political left; in recent years contributors have included Labour MPs Jo Cox, Khalid Mahmood, and Alison McGovern.

In 2020 it absorbed Open Europe, a Eurosceptic think tank working on the European Union. In November 2020, it awarded the inaugural Grotius Prize to Scott Morrison, Australian Prime Minister, "in recognition of his work in support of the international rules based order".

Projects

Britain in the World 
In January 2020, Policy Exchange hosted a high-level public discussion with US Secretary of State Mike Pompeo and UK Foreign Secretary Dominic Raab, at a prominent location in Westminster.

In February 2020, Open Europe's team joined Policy Exchange to lead the work of the Britain in the World project, where the research is focused on international trade and the opportunities for "Global Britain" after Brexit. The Head of Britain in the World project was previously Professor John Bew., who left to join the Number 10 Policy Unit.

The former Australian PM Kevin Rudd, responding to Stephen Kinnock at a Policy Exchange event at Labour Party Conference in autumn 2020, argued that there is a need to "reset" British foreign policy towards the Indo-Pacific. This idea has been pursued by Policy Exchange in its Indo-Pacific Commission, a project chaired by Stephen Harper, former Canadian PM, and given public support by Shinzo Abe, former Japanese Prime Minister, who argued in a foreword to the Commission's first report: "Britain can work with countries throughout the region on upholding democratic values and supporting the multinational institutions that have developed in recent years. On the security front, the British military, and the Royal Navy in particular, will be a welcome presence in the seas of the Indo-Pacific."

Integration Hub 
The Integration Hub, in partnership with Policy Exchange, explores ethnic integration across five distinct themes – Residential Patterns, Work and Welfare, Society and Everyday Life, Education, and Attitudes and Identity. It allows people to explore integration across England and Wales through interactive data maps.

Judicial Power Project 
Policy Exchange's Judicial Power Project researches whether the power of judges has increased in the UK, and what effect such a rise in judicial power is having on the principle of the separation of powers. The research unit focuses on the proper scope of judicial power within the Westminster constitution, arguing that judicial overreach increasingly threatens the rule of law and effective, democratic government. The Judicial Power Project has been at the heart of debate surrounding the UK Government's proposed derogation from the ECHR European Convention on Human Rights. Policy Exchange's Judicial Power Project has also been involved in scrutinising the 2016 case R (Miller) v Secretary of State for Exiting the European Union, publishing a number of arguments that were used by the Government in their Supreme Court appeal.

The head of Judicial Power Project is Professor Richard Ekins, Tutorial Fellow in Law at St John's College, Oxford and Professor of Law and Constitutional Government in the University of Oxford; the Project Website Editor is Professor Graham Gee, Professor of Public Law at the University of Sheffield. Contributors include Sir Patrick Elias, Timothy Endicott, John Finnis, Dame Susan Glazebrook, Sir Stephen Laws, Sir Noel Malcolm, Baroness O'Neill of Bengarve, Lord Phillips of Worth Matravers, and John Tasioulas.

In September 2017, Andrew Gimson in ConservativeHome wrote that 'Policy Exchange's work on "lawfare", as it came to be known, was the UK equivalent of the Manhattan Institute's "Broken Windows" moment, for it drastically changed the terms of the debate, and led to decisive action to deal with the problem."

In July 2018, the Judicial Power Project published Judicial Power and the Left, a series of essays examining the issue of judicial activism from the left of politics. In the Foreword, Labour MP Jon Cruddas argued, "The retreat towards the law and the continental constitutional separation of powers, and away from democracy and parliamentary sovereignty, have been very powerful tendencies within the left over the past fifty years."

In December 2019, in the Policy Exchange paper, Protecting the Constitution, the Head of the Judicial Power Project, Professor Richard Ekins, wrote about the expansion of judicial power in the UK in recent years and how and why Parliament is responsible for maintaining the balance of the constitution and should restate limits on judicial power by restoring the political constitution and the common law tradition.

The former Lord Chief Justice, Lord Thomas of Cwmgiedd, argued in the foreword to a July 2020 Judicial Power Project paper on reforming the Supreme Court, "There are some who wish this debate to 'go away'. That is not, in my view, a tenable position..." Suella Braverman, the Attorney General forEngland and Wales, described the Judicial Power Project as "so influential, and so often mentioned in Parliament, both on the left and right. At times it seems that it is the only public defender of constitutional orthodoxy". Conversely, Thomas Poole has attacked the Judicial Power Project as "The Executive Power Project", arguing that the JPP's approach owes more to anarcho-conservatism than to constitutional conservatism.

Liveable London 
Liveable London is a policy programme which attempts to develop new ideas to make London a better place to live and work. Grown out of the Capital City Foundation initiative, Liveable London focuses on the everyday experiences of Londoners, addressing both structural and small challenges the capital faces.

New Politics Monitor 
The New Politics Monitor is a project that seeks to 'chart and understand the ongoing transformation of British politics.'This project looks at how politics is changing and how policy reacts. Recent reports include, Academic freedom in the UK and An Age of Incivility.

Biology Policy Unit 
In October 2022, Labour MP Rosie Duffield, SNP MP Joanna Cherry, and Conservative peer Baroness Jenkin of Kennington announced a new "biology matters" policy unit at Policy Exchange which aims to document the spread of policies informed by gender identity theory in the public sector, and which is making a public call for evidence.

Funding 
Think tank Transparify, which is funded by the Open Society Foundations, ranked Policy Exchange as one of the three least transparent think tanks in the UK in relation to funding. Transparify's report How Transparent are Think Tanks about Who Funds Them 2016? rated them as 'highly opaque,' one of 'a handful of think tanks that refuse to reveal even the identities of their donors.' However, Policy Exchange does list some sponsors inside its reports, such as the European Climate Foundation and the Gates Foundation. In 2022 it was revealed that the organisation is partially funded by ExxonMobil. In November 2022, the funding transparency website Who Funds You? gave Policy Exchange an E grade, the lowest transparency rating (rating goes from A to E).

Publications
Policy Exchange authors have included former government advisor Professor Dieter Helm, economist Robert Shiller, author and broadcaster Bill Bryson, historian and journalist Anna Reid, former Financial Times journalist John Willman, and Olympic athlete James Cracknell.

Building More, Building Beautiful 
In June 2018, Policy Exchange published Building More, Building Beautiful, which argued that if developers build more homes in ways that the public find beautiful, there will be less opposition to new housebuilding. The paper argued that this would make development less risky, with increased benefits to people's physical and mental health. The report included a poll of more than 5,000 people, which detailed their preferences for the design and style of the built environment. Its foreword was written by James Brokenshire, Secretary of State for Housing, Communities and Local Government, and the report was by commended by Theresa May in a speech to Policy Exchange.

The Government subsequently announced the establishment of the Building Better, Building Beautiful Commission, an independent body that will advise ministers on how to promote and increase the use of high-quality design for new build homes and neighbourhoods. An article in The Economist hailed the policy as the "brainchild of Policy Exchange" and "the biggest idea in housing policy since the sale of council houses under Margaret Thatcher." To feed ideas into the Commission, in January 2019 Policy Exchange also published Building Beautiful, a cross-party essay collection with contributions from politics, architecture and the housebuilding industry, including by the Housing Minister Kit Malthouse MP, Dame Fiona Reynolds, and Jon Cruddas MP.

In a Policy Exchange event on beauty in the built environment and the left, Lisa Nandy, MP for Wigan, argued that the building of "grim, grey, massive tower blocks" in the post-war period was proof that the planning authorities had not listened to the concerns of ordinary people.

The New Netwar: Countering Extremism Online 
In 2017 Policy Exchanged published The New Netwar: Countering Extremism Online, which provided a comprehensive analysis of the struggle against online extremism. It included a major survey of public opinion which showed that two-thirds of people believe the leading social media companies are not doing enough to combat online radicalisation. Three-quarters of people want the companies to do more to locate and remove extremist content. The report explored a range of policy options for interdicting the supply-chain of extremist content. In covering the report, Con Coughlin of the Daily Telegraph called Policy Exchange "One of London's most effective think tanks, which has done ground-breaking research on the emerging jihadi threat" while William Booth of the Washington Post said that its "reports often inform government policy in Britain".

The Fog of Law 
In 2013 Policy Exchange published The Fog of Law, which argued that the increasing application of civilian norms to military conflict, and resulting increase in legal claims against the Ministry of Defence, risked undermining the effectiveness of the armed forces and therefore the security of the nation. The co-authors were former US army lawyer Laura Croft and former British Army officer Tom Tugendhat.

The report recommended that the government should legislate to define Combat Immunity to allow military personnel to take decisions without having to worry about risk of prosecution, that the MoD should be exempt from the Corporate Manslaughter and Corporate Homicide Act 2007, for the UK to derogate from the European Convention on Human Rights during deployed operations and for legal aid to be removed from foreign nationals.

In March 2015, an update was published called Clearing the Fog of Law by Tom Tugendhat, Professor Richard Ekins and Dr Jonathan Morgan. This further developed the argument that the expansion of "lawfare" hinders the ability of commanders on the ground to make immediate and potentially life-or-death decisions. Five former Chiefs of the General staff wrote to the Times on 8 April 2015 to support the recommendations, saying "We urge the government to recognise the primacy of the Geneva Conventions in war by derogating from the European Convention on Human Rights in time of war and redefining combat immunity through legislation to ensure that our serving personnel are able to operate in the field without fear of the laws designed for peacetime environments."

At the Conservative party conference in October 2016, Michael Fallon announced that the Government would follow Policy Exchange's recommendations, saying in his platform speech that "in future conflicts we intend to derogate from the Convention. That would protect our Armed Forces from many of the industrial scale claims we have seen post Iraq and Afghanistan. Now this isn't about putting our Armed Forces above the criminal law or the Geneva Conventions. Serious claims will be investigated – but spurious claims will be stopped. And our Armed Forces will be able to do their job, fighting the enemy, not the lawyers." The Ministry of Defence published a consultation on 5 December 2016 as a first step to turning Fallon's speech into reality.

Andrew Gimson of ConservativeHome said that "Policy Exchange's work on "lawfare", as it came to be known, was the UK equivalent of the Manhattan Institute's "Broken Windows" moment, for it drastically changed the terms of the debate, and led to decisive action to deal with the problem."

The Cost of Doing Nothing 
In 2016, the Labour MP Jo Cox started working with Conservative MP Tom Tugendhat on a pamphlet which would examine Britain's attitude to intervening in humanitarian situations overseas. They intended to publish the report to coincide with the publication of The Iraq Inquiry's report into the origins of the Iraq War. The report was put on hold when Jo Cox was murdered in June 2016. However, her family agreed that the report should be completed and her friend Labour MP Alison McGovern helped Tugendhat to finish it.

The report examines the history of British intervention overseas and argues that successful examples such as Sierra Leone, Kosovo and the Gulf War demonstrate the value potential for intervention to succeed. The authors contrasted this with examples of Britain and the wider international community failing to intervene in time to prevent mass atrocities, such as the Rwandan genocide, massacres in Bosnia and most recently the death of hundreds of thousands of people in the Syrian Civil War.

A supportive message from Prime Minister Theresa May was printed on the back cover, reading "There are few more complex questions than when to intervene overseas. Jo Cox was an inspirational humanitarian who cared deeply about preventing violence and protecting people around the world. It is a fitting part of Jo's legacy that this paper will challenge politicians of all parties to consider how we can put such considerations at the heart of the decisions we take". The report was launched by former Prime Minister Gordon Brown with Tom Tugendhat and Alison McGovern on 26 January 2017.

Clean Brexit 
In January 2017, Policy Exchange published a paper by the economists Gerard Lyons and Liam Halligan which argued that the United Kingdom should leave the European Economic Area when it leaves the European Union and that the British economy could thrive trading under World Trade Organisation tariffs.

In the week following its publication, Theresa May made a speech setting out her proposed approach to Brexit which incorporated many of the ideas set out in 'Clean Brexit', including that she would be prepared to walk away from negotiations if the EU does not offer a good enough deal.

Just About Managing classes 
In June 2015, Policy Exchange published 'Overlooked But Decisive: Connecting with England's Just about Managing classes'. The report examined the values and political attitudes of C1 and C2 voters by the NRS social grade classifications in marginal seats in England. The author of the report, James Frayne, argued that these families rely heavily on public services like state schools and the NHS, and rely on a stable economy, low inflation and low interest rates to keep their jobs and ensure their mortgage payments are affordable.

The phrase 'Just About Managing', coined by Policy Exchange and now abbreviated to JAMs, was reportedly adopted by civil servants ahead of the Autumn Statement in November 2016 to describe the people who Theresa May's government hoped to help.

Education 
Policy Exchange's work on education is acknowledged as some of its most influential contribution to debate – Schools Week wrote in February 2017 that "Policy Exchange's power can be seen in the impressive number of policies foreshadowed in their reports: reducing the frequency of Ofsted inspections, sharpening up accountability, removing vocational qualifications from league tables in favour of a focus on so-called academic GCSEs."

More Homes: Fewer Empty Buildings

In March 2011, Policy Exchange published a report that argued government should reform the Use Classes Order to make it much easier to move buildings and land from Use Classes A (retail) and B (employment) to C3 (dwelling houses). The report postulated that such a move would result in a more collaborative and flexible development model that delivers both more and better development.

In April 2011, the Government produced a consultation document on reducing planning controls relating to the conversion of commercial properties to residential use. The results of the public consultation were published in July 2012. The summary document showed that just 12% of respondents supported the proposed reform of the use class order in relation to commercial to residential conversion. In January 2013 various news sources reported that the Planning Minister Nick Boles was planning on pushing ahead with the reform of the use class order, in line with the Policy Exchange proposals of 2011.

Modernising the United Kingdom 
In August 2019, Policy Exchange published a report looking at ways the new Conservative government could work to modersnise the United Kingdom. The report argued that the new government should pursue a 'Grand Strategy to modernise the United Kingdom, drawing on the strength of the Union to stimulate local areas through both an audacious programme of infrastructure investment and further devolution of powers.'

It pushed for greater devolution and enhancement of community and government partnerships. The report was cited as an insight into how Johnson's government plan to strengthen the Union.

McDonnellomics 
In October 2019, in anticipation of the UK December election, Policy Exchange published McDonnellomics: How Labour's economic agenda would transform the UK. The paper looked at John McDonnell's policy approach and political inspiration. It argued that ‘‘McDonnellomics' would represent the biggest shift in UK economic policy since the advent of Thatcherism.'

Lord Mandelson wrote a foreword to the paper and argued: "Instead of moving Britain forward, with new ideas and utilising the opportunities that digital technology and AI, for example, offer us to transform the economy and public services, a Corbyn-McDonnell government wants to reassert the statist mindset that New Labour disavowed."

Academic freedom in the UK 
In November 2019, Policy Exchange published a paper arguing that universities should be places of free speech and should avoid a 'culture of conformity'. Polling that informed the paper revealed that 'a solid core of 30% of students are consistently in favour of free speech' however noted that 'cancel culture' was becoming prevalent on UK campuses.

Gavin Williamson endorsed the paper in an article in The Times in which he wrote, 'Despite the "snowflake" stereotype, recent polling by the Policy Exchange think tank shows a large number of students want an environment in which they're free to hear a diversity of views. Yet one only needs to look at the worsening situation on US campuses to see the importance of taking action here.' He went on to claim that the current situation was so serious that, 'if universities don't take action, the government will.'

Whitehall Reimagined and Government Reimagined 
In December 2019, a report looking into civil service reform was published by Policy Exchange. The report argued for policy proposals that would make 'the civil service more democratically accountable and better able to deliver on the mandate of the government of the day.' The report was widely covered by the media as it was highlighted that Dominic Cummings was 'used as a source by the think tank Policy Exchange for its new briefing paper "Whitehall Reimagined", which recommended that the Prime Minister's office and special advisers should lead fundamental reforms to "unlock the potential" of the civil service.'

In October 2020, Policy Exchange established a Commission of "heavy-hitters" to examine how the Civil Service could be improved and modernised. The Policy Exchange Reform of Government Commission was composed of  Dame Patricia Hodgson (Chair),  Rt Hon Hazel Blears,  Rt Hon Sir Lockwood Smith,  Lord Macpherson of Earl's Court, Trevor Phillips, Robert Gascoyne-Cecil, 7th Marquess of Salisbury,  General Sir Peter Wall,  Lord Caine of Temple Newsam,  Rt Hon Baroness Morgan of Cotes, Ben Houchen, and  Rt Hon Lord Hill of Oareford. The Commission heard from a range of expert witnesses, including  Lord Sedwill, former Cabinet Secretary; Lord Blunkett, former Home Secretary; and  Lord Maude, former Cabinet Office minister.

The Commission published its final report, entitled "Government Reimagined: A Handbook for Reform", in May 2021. The report, which was written by Policy Exchange's Head of Technology Policy, Benjamin Barnard, received widespread media coverage. The report was endorsed by a range of figures including  Rt Hon Michael Gove MP (then Chancellor of the Duchy of Lancaster),  Sir Howard Bernstein (former Chief Executive of Manchester City Council), and Dame Sue Owen (former Permanent Secretary at DCMS). In June 2021, the Government set out a Declaration on Government Reform, which echoed the recommendations made in Government Reimagined.

Addresses 
Policy Exchange has been addressed by senior figures from all governments of the past 15 years including Hazel Blears, Gordon Brown, David Cameron, Nick Clegg, Sir Michael Fallon, Michael Gove, Philip Hammond, Jeremy Hunt, Sajid Javid, Boris Johnson, Theresa May, Ed Miliband, Baroness Morgan, Dominc Raab and Amber Rudd.

Other speakers include Lord Brown of Eaton-under-Heywood, Mark Carney, Dr Andrea Coscelli CBE, S Jaishankar, Professor William E. Kovacic, John Larkin QC, General James Mattis, Benjamin Netanyahu, General David Petraeus, James Plunkett, Mike Pompeo, Speaker Paul Ryan, Malcolm Turnbull and Rt Hon Lord Tyrie.

In October 2019, Prime Minister Boris Johnson, in what was his first appearance at a think tank as Prime Minister, introduced the author Charles Moore at a Policy Exchange event marking the book launch of Moore's 'Margaret Thatcher: Herself Alone'.

In May 2019, Prime Minister Theresa May launched the Augar Report in a keynote speech at Policy Exchange. She appeared with Rt Hon Damian Hinds MP, the Education Secretary, and Philip Augar.

In December 2017, in what was the first time two holders of these positions have spoken together in a public forum, Policy Exchange hosted US National Security Advisor Lt. Gen. H.R. McMaster and his British counterpart, the National Security Adviser to the Prime Minister, Mark Sedwill CMG to discuss The New US National Security Strategy.

Alumni 
Its alumni can be found across parliament and government – including Baroness Evans of Bowes Park (Leader of the House of Lords and previously Deputy Director of Policy Exchange); Neil O'Brien (MP for Harborough and previously Director of Policy Exchange); and Nicholas Boles (former MP for Grantham and Stamford and previously Director of Policy Exchange).

Senior Trustees, staff and Senior Fellows 
 The Honourable Mr Alexander Downer, AC, Chairman
 Dame Patricia Hodgson, DBE, Deputy Chairman
 The Lord Feldman of Elstree, PC, Treasurer
 The Lord Godson, Director
 Ms Julia Mizen, Managing Director
 Mr Will Heaven, Director of Policy 
 Mr Warwick Lightfoot, Head of Economics
 Mr David Goodhart, Head of the Demography, Immigration and Integration Unit 
 Mr Richard Ekins, Head of the Judicial Power Project 
 Dr Graham Gudgin, Chief Economic Adviser
 Sir John Jenkins, KCMG, LVO, Senior Fellow
 Sir Stephen Laws, KCB, KC, Senior Fellow
 Dr Gerard Lyons, Senior Fellow
 Sir Noel Malcolm, FRSL, FBA, Senior Adviser on Human Rights
 The Lord Moore of Etchingham, Visiting Scholar
 Sir Trevor Phillips, OBE, ARCS, FIC, Senior Fellow
 Ms Juliet Samuel, Senior Fellow
 William Shawcross, CVO, Senior Fellow
 Mr William Schneider Jnr, Senior Fellow
 Richard Walton, Senior Fellow

See also
 List of think tanks in the United Kingdom

References

External links
 Official website

2002 establishments in the United Kingdom
Organisations associated with the Conservative Party (UK)
Organisations based in London
Political and economic think tanks based in the United Kingdom
Think tanks based in the United Kingdom